René Orlando Houseman (19 July 1953 – 22 March 2018), nicknamed Loco, was an Argentine footballer, who played as a right winger. At the beginning of his career, Houseman was considered successor of legendary winger Omar Corbatta, being still regarded by many sports journalists as one of the best Argentine wingers ever.

An extraordinarily skilled player, Houseman was characterised by his outstanding dribbling ability, speed and mischief into the field.

Club career

Houseman was born in La Banda, Santiago del Estero Province. Despite having started his career at Club Atlético Excursionistas youth divisions, Houseman debuted professionally playing for  Excursionistas's arch-rival Defensores de Belgrano, where he won its first title, the Primera C championship in 1971. At the beginning of 1973, as a recommendation by manager César Menotti, he was hired by Club Atlético Huracán.

Houseman was a keyplayer of the Huracán team that won the 1973 Metropolitano championship. Managed by Menotti, that squad is widely regarded as one of the best Argentine teams ever, where Houseman played along with notable players such as Miguel Brindisi, Carlos Babington and Omar Larrosa.

After leaving Huracán in 1980, Houseman spent a short time in River Plate (only one season, 1981), then moving to Chile to play for Colo Colo and then to South Africa when he joined AmaZulu F.C.

In 1984 he returned to Argentina to play for Independiente but he only played three matches in total. Nevertheless, Houseman was part of the roster that won the Libertadores and Intercontinental Cups that year.

Houseman retired from football in 1985, playing for his first club, Excursionistas, a match v. Boca Juniors.

International career

During his international career Houseman also played for the Argentina national team and participated at the 1974 FIFA World Cup, where he scored three goals. His greatest achievement in football was being a member of the 1978 FIFA World Cup winning team and scoring in the 6–0 win over Peru.

Post retirement
Houseman was part of the coaching staff led by Angel Cappa that managed Huracán between 2008 and 2009. He said he was never paid for his services.

Personal life
Houseman's career was cut short due to problems with alcoholism, with which he struggled for most of his life. Houseman even scored a goal versus River Plate which he later claimed not to remember as he was drunk throughout that game. In 2017, it was revealed that Houseman had tongue cancer. The Argentine Football Association announced that it would help him to afford medical treatment.

Houseman died on 22 March 2018 after a long battle with cancer, eight days after the death of his 1978 teammate, Ruben Galvan.

Honours

Club
Defensores de Belgrano
 Primera C: 1972

Club Atlético Huracán|Huracán
Primera División: 1973 Metropolitano

Independiente
Copa Libertadores: 1984
Intercontinental Cup: 1984

International
Argentina
FIFA World Cup: 1978
Copa Newton: 1975, 1976
Copa Lipton: 1976
Copa Félix Bogado: 1976
Copa Ramón Castilla: 1976, 1978

References

External links

 

1953 births
2018 deaths
People from Santiago del Estero
Argentine footballers
Argentine expatriate footballers
Association football forwards
Defensores de Belgrano footballers
Club Atlético Huracán footballers
Club Atlético River Plate footballers
Colo-Colo footballers
Club Atlético Independiente footballers
Argentine Primera División players
Argentina international footballers
Expatriate footballers in Chile
1974 FIFA World Cup players
1978 FIFA World Cup players
FIFA World Cup-winning players
Argentine people of German descent
AmaZulu F.C. players
Burials at La Chacarita Cemetery
Deaths from cancer in Argentina
Sportspeople from Santiago del Estero Province